Frederick Alexcee (1853 – 1940s) was a Canadian carver and painter from the community of Lax Kw'alaams with Tsimshian ethnicity.

Alexcee (his last name has also been spelled Alexie, Alexee, etc.) was born in Lax Kw'alaams, then known as Fort Simpson, in 1853.  His father was an Iroquois laborer from eastern Canada who was in the employee of the Hudson's Bay Company at Fort Simpson.  His mother was Tsimshian from the Giluts'aaw tribe, one of the "Nine Tribes" from the lower Skeena River area based at Lax Kw'alaams.  In the matrilineal system of the Tsimshian, Alexcee followed his mother as a Giluts'aaw and as a member of the Gispwudwada (Killerwhale clan or phratry).  His Tsimshian name was 'Wiiksmwan, meaning Great Deer Woman.

Alexcee was trained as a halaayt carver, the term halaayt referring to shamanic practices which were the prerogative of chiefs.  He produced naxnox (spirit) paraphernalia and items for use in "secret society" ceremonies.  All of these were practices which late-19th-century missionaries in Lax Kw'alaams were endeavoring to eradicate.  Alexcee also carved for the Indian curio trade and produced paintings and drawings depicting traditional life in Port Simpson. In 1927, two of his paintings were exhibited at the National Gallery of Canada.

He carved human figures to adorn a baptismal font in Port Simpson's Methodist church.

He died some time in the 1940s.

Works of his can be found at the University of British Columbia's Museum of Anthropology, the Museum of Northern British Columbia in Prince Rupert, the New Westminster Museum and Archives, the Royal British Columbia Museum in Victoria, and the Wellcome Collection in London, England.

Bibliography

Barbeau, Marius (1945) "Frederick Alexie: A Primitive."  Canadian Review of Music and Art, vol. 3, no. 11/12.
Hawker, Ronald William (1991) "Frederick Alexie: Euro-Canadian Discussions of a First Nations Artist."  Canadian Journal of Native Studies, vol. 11, no. 2, pp. 229–252.
Hawker, Ronald W., "Transformed or Transformative? Two Northwest Coast Artists in the Era of Assimilation" in American Indian Culture and Research Vol. 25, No. 2 (2001), 37–61.
Hawker, Ronald W. Tales of Ghosts: First Nations art in British Columbia, 1922–61. Vancouver: UBC Press, 2003.

McCormick, Kaitlin A. "Neither One nor the ‘Other’": The Unique Oeuvre of Frederick Alexcee. Unpublished Masters’ Thesis. Ottawa: Carleton University Faculty of Arts and
Sciences, 2010.
Simmons, Diedre. "Frederick Alexcee, Indian Artist (c. 1857 to c. 1944)" The Journal of Canadian Art History. 14 (1 August 1992).

Other publications featuring work by Alexcee
MacDonald, George F., and John J. Cove (eds.) (1987) Tsimshian Narratives. Collected by Marius Barbeau and William Beynon. (Canadian Museum of Civilization Mercury Series, Directorate Paper 3.) 2 vols. Ottawa: Directorate, Canadian Museum of Civilization.
MacDonald, George F. (1984) "Painted Houses and Woven Blankets: Symbols of Wealth in Tsimshian Art and Myth."  In The Tsimshian and Their Neighbors of the North Pacific Coast, ed. by Jay Miller and Carol M. Eastman, pp. 109–136.  Seattle: University of Washington Press.
Marsden, Susan (ed.) (1992) Suwilaay'msga Na Ga'niiyatgm, Teachings of Our Grandfathers.  7 vols.  Prince Rupert, B.C.: First Nations Advisory Council of School District #52.
Neylan, Susan (2003) The Heavens Are Changing: Nineteenth-Century Protestant Missions and Tsimshian Christianity.  Montreal: McGill-Queen's University Press.

1853 births
1940s deaths
19th-century First Nations people
20th-century First Nations sculptors
Canadian male sculptors
20th-century Canadian male artists
Artists from British Columbia
People from Lax Kw'alaams
Tsimshian woodcarvers